This is a list of seasons in Swedish football, where each article includes the national top league tables in Swedish football, as well as cup results, national team results and a summary of other events during the season.

History 

Football was first played in Sweden in the 1870s, but it was not until the 1890s that any regular leagues and tournaments were played. The first Swedish Champions were decided in 1896, and the first national league was played in 1910. The national team played its first international in 1908. The first official premier league, Allsvenskan, was started in 1924. Both the second league, Division 2, and third league, Division 3, became official in 1928.

The national cup, Svenska Cupen, started in 1941, and regular seasons were played during both World Wars. Swedish football seasons changed to spring-autumn style in 1959 after having been played autumn-spring regularly since the early 1910s. Many changes to the format of Allsvenskan were made during the 1980s. Division 1 was introduced as the second highest league in 1987. Division 1 was replaced by Superettan in 2000, but was reintroduced again in 2006 as the third highest league, below Superettan but above Division 2. The Scandinavian Championship, Royal League, was started in 2004 and is played during the winter.

Seasons

Legend

References 
References used for the whole series of articles:

Print

Online